"Dear Pen Pal" is a science fiction short story by Canadian-American writer A. E. van Vogt.

Plot summary
The one-sided dialog takes the form of correspondence from Skander, an alien, to an unnamed human whose replies are not presented. Skander spends some time in the first letters describing his home planet of Aurigae II, a hot planet circling a star in Auriga. Later, Skander admits that he is a criminal, incarcerated for conducting illegal scientific experiments. Desiring to see his pen pal, he sends several photographic sheets that can be exposed if the user simply thinks about a picture being taken.

The last letter is from the unnamed human back to Skander. The human is now in Skander's body. He realized long ago that Skander was trying to scam him, and immediately took the "photographs" to the Earth authorities. They informed him they were a form of consciousness transfer device that Skander was attempting to use to escape from prison. Learning this, the human went through with the process anyway.

The letter reveals that the human has a body that was paralyzed since birth and is subject to heart attacks. He hopes that Skander will enjoy the short time that he has left, trapped in a dying body.

Publication history
The story was originally published in The Arkham Sampler (1949) and has been published in many collections and anthologies, such as Destination: Universe!, Far Boundaries and such, the most recent being The Arkham Sampler: A Facsimile Edition (2010).

Variant titles
Out of This World Adventures, July 1950, as "Letter from the Stars"
The Earth in Peril / Who Speaks of Conquest?, 1957, as "Letter from the Stars"

It has also been translated into Italian ("Pianeta Aurigae", "Caro Corrispondente"), Dutch ("Beste Correspondentievriend"), French ("Correspondence"), and German ("Lieber Brieffreund").

References

External links 
  p.104

1949 short stories
Science fiction short stories
Short stories by A. E. van Vogt
Works originally published in The Arkham Sampler
Extraterrestrial life in popular culture